John Edward Gunby Hadath  (30 April 187117 January 1954) was an English schoolmaster, lawyer, company promoter, songwriter, journalist, and author of boarding school stories. He is best remembered for over seventy novels (almost all juvenile fiction) of which over two-thirds were set in English Public Schools.

Early life

Hadath was born at the Rectory in Owersby, Lincolnshire, England on 30 April 1871, the only son of Reverend Edward Evans Hadath  (c. 189219 Nov 1873), the Rector of Owersby and Charlotte Elizabeth (first quarter of 184027 April 1912), the eldest daughter of Rev. John Mobray Pearson (11 February 1809third quarter of 1850), a Wesleyan Minister.

Hadath's father dies when he is two, and after initially attending a Dame school, he was sent to the Clergy Orphan School at St Thomas Hill in Canterbury, where the 1881 census found him registered as a scholar. He was athletic, and like the hero of one of his own school stories, was Captain of the school. He matriculated for Cambridge in October 1889 and was admitted as a resident student to Peterhouse College on 2 October 1889.  At Cambridge he continuing his sporting career and earned his college colours for rugby, soccer, and cricket. He was awarded his BA in 1892, and began a career as a schoolmaster.

Early career
On leaving Cambridge Hadath taught first at Montpellier School in Paignton. This Private or Preparatory School had just been acquired by Bertram Bennet  (18 April 186421 March 1925), who was a few years ahead of Hadath at Peterhouse. Bertram was another athlete. By 1894 the school was advertising Hadath as the Second Master, after the Head Master. In 1894 also, Hadath was advertising for private pupils, so he cannot have been content with his salary. It is not clear how many years Hadath remained teaching here, but no advertisements referring to him can be found after 1895.

Branching out
Hadath was awarded him MA degree in January 1896 and was the Senior Classics Master at Guildford Grammar-School He continued to play sports, especially cricket.

Hadath married Florence Annie Webber (9 January 187323 January 1960)  in Tonbridge in the third quarter of 1898. The couple never had any children. Florence was one of the few people who could read Hadath's awful handwriting and she used to type his stories for submission. Florences's twin sister Ella Maud was living with them in 1939. She had been the Matron at Dulwich School for many years. By 18 August 1900 the Hadath's were living at what would be their long-term address of 39 Chichele Road, Cricklewood, North London. It was still his address when he died. As well as the Cricklewood Address, Hadeth also had a Chalet at Saint-Gervais-les-Bains, in the French Alps, near the Haute Savoie and Mont Blanc. He was a member of the Alpine Club of France. He was made a Citoyen d’Honneur of the town in 1932.

Hadath was a keen sportsman. He was on the school and college teams at St Edmunds and Peterhouse. After leaving school, he play Rugby as an amateur, but injury stopped him from playing for Devon. Florence was also a keen sportswoman. The Times reported that she collected holes in the most merciless fashion when playing on the Legal Association team in 1920.

It is not known when Hadath ceased teaching, but by 1902 he had already a good income from song-writing, having had more than 100 songs published.Hadath was also working for a number of companies. In 1897, Hadath was appointed liquidator for the Candelaria Gold Mine Limited, a liquidation that was only completed in 1902. Hadeth was listed as company secretary for two copper mines in 1903, The Copaquire Copper Sulphate Co. Ltd, with a mine in Copaquire, Tarapaca, Chile, and the Chile Copper Sulphate Syndicate, Ltd. which was leasing the lands to the first company. In 1907 he was the Company Secretary of British Coalite. 1909 found him company secretary to Sierra Morena Copper Mines Ltd, with an idle copper mine in Penaflor, Seville, Spain. Hadath was admitted to the Inner Temple on 20 February 1908.

Between 1896 and 1910, Hadath earned between £1,300 and £1,400 from his songwriting. However, his losses from his speculations on the stock exchange exceeded this. He lost nearly £2,000 on the stock market and he was declared bankrupt on 19 January 1910. He had an initial hearing in February 1910, in which he declared that he had been a schoolmaster, a secretary of more than one company, a journalist and songwriter.
 
At a subsequent hearing on 28 July 1910, the Official Receiver reported that Hadath's bankruptcy had been brought on by rash and hazardous speculations. Because of this, the Registrar suspended the discharge for two years, and Hadath's discharge was to date from 28 July 1912.

Hadath joined up in the First World War and served in the 6th Battalion of the Middlesex Volunteer Regiment. This was a reserve battalion and was in Mill Hill in North London when war broke out, and were almost immediately sent to Gillingham in Kent. In November 1915, the Battalion was sent to nearby Chatham where the remained for the rest of the war.   and was never sent to as a First-Class Light Guns instructor at Hythe, in Kent, England. Hadath was appointed to the Rank of Captain (Temporary) on 2 February 1917. He resigned his commission due to ill-health on 2 December 1918.

Later life

After the war, Hadath began coaching pupils for the bar exam. He continued writing, and published right up to his death. Hadath was the director and co-trustee of the Benevolent Fund of the Performing Right Society. His first essay into such work was his appeal for the destitute family of the Italian song composer Piccolomini in the Musical Times of 1 August 1900. Hadath was made a Fellow of the Royal Society of the Arts,

Hadath dies in a London Hospital on 17 January 1954. Florence survived him another six years, until 1960.

Hadath has attracted a lot of praise for his writing:
Hadath became famous for his authentic and true-to-life school stories . 
. . . his name became one of the best known and best loved of those who aim to instruct as well as entertain youth
His articulate and highly intelligent (as well as often very funny) school stories often spotlighted real-life social problems.
Sports, humor, and loyalty play an important role in his sixty novels 
. . . he has been a schoolmaster, and is a schoolboy at heart still. He has the atmosphere of the public school. Boys know it and revel in it. 
It is a pleasant surprise to find an old favourite still writing, and still writing well.

But not everyone shared such high regard for Gunby: In New Zealand Dorothy Neal White, children's librarian at Dunedin, began in 1937 to organize the steady withdrawal from her shelves of books by writers judged second-rate, e.g. Percy Westerman, Elinor Brent-Dyer, and Gunby Hadath.

Hadath himself identified one of the problems facing his work. Juvenile fiction was a poor relation of other literature. It attracted far less attention than adult fiction, and far less monetary reward. There is undoubtedly an impression too many quarters that anybody can write books for young people, whereas actually youth is an exceedingly critical audience.

By the time he died, the weekly boy's reading papers, which had sustained the genre through serialisation, were all but gone. Eyre said The school story was always an artificial type and its decline towards the middle of the century was neither unexpected nor deplored. Trease noted that the boys’ school-story iswith a few notable exceptionsnon-existent in the new lists.

Writing
Hadath had his first published juvenile fiction story, a school story, published in The Captain in 1909. It was a story about a boy called Foozle who was to be one of his recurring characters. It may have been that Hadath was already feeling the financial pinch when he wrote the story. He had applied for bankruptcy on 18 November 1909, and owed over three hundred pounds in interest to money lenders when he first appeared in court.

Hadath wrote for The Captain and other boy's papers including Chums, The Modern Boy, and The Boy's Own Paper. His serial stories were almost always published later in book form.

Pseudonyms and attribution
Hadath used a range of pseudonyms, mainly for his short fiction, with a few exception:
Duncan James. No potential titles listed under this name n The British Library catalogue.
Felix O'Grady. No titles listed under this name in The British Library catalogue. 
Florence Gunby Hadath. Florence was Hadath's wife's name, and using this pseudonym he wrote the Pamela series of stories for girls. Four unique titles are listed under this name in The British Library catalogue. 
Shepherd (sometimes given as Shepperd) Pearson The name seems to come from George Shepherd Pearson (second quarter of 184418 February 1906), Hadath's maternal uncle, who nominated Hadath as one of the executors of his estate. One title listed under this name in The British Library catalogue, The Second Count (1944). 
John Mowbray . John Mowbray were the given names of both Hadath's maternal grandfather Rev. John Mowbray Pearson (11 Feb 180919 July 1850). and a maternal uncle of the same name (fourth quarter of 1838). Fourteen unique titles under this name are listed in The British Library catalogue.

The authorship of the books by John Mowbray is disputed. Edwards says Mowbray had been identified with Hadath until the British Museum (now Library) catalogue firmly declared Mowbray the pseudonym of one J. G. H. Vahey, with no additional proof.  The British Library sometimes indicated pseudonymous authorship unequivocally, as in the case of Harry Collingwood where his books are listed in the catalogue as being authored by Collingwood, Harry, pseud. (i.e. William Joseph Cosens Lancaster.) In the case of John Mowbray, there is now no such unequivocal assignment, it is merely that the year of birth and death are the same as those of Vahey as in Mowbray, John, 1881-1938.

John George Haslette Vahey (188115 June 1934) was born in Belfast, Northern Ireland and attended Foyle College. He later attended school in Hannover, Germany. He had moved to England by the 1911 census with an address in Bournemouth. Kemp et al. say that Vahey became an accomplished hack writer and published over forty crime novel, fourteen under his own name, twenty-two as Vernon Loder, four as Walter Proudfoot, seven as Henrietta Clandon, and five as Anthony Lang. He also published verse, and a volume of angling stories. He published seven novels under 4 different aliases in 1933, his most productive year. Kemp et al. also say that Vahey published fourteen novels as John Mowbray.

However, it appears that Hadath also used the pseudonym. The evidence for Hadath's authorship of the books by John Mowbray is as follows:
The Mowbray novels, with one exception, are all juvenile fiction, whereas all the books published by Vahey under his other pseudonyms, are adult crime novels and thrillers.
The pseudonym, John Mowbray, like the other two pseudonyms which Hadath used for published books, can be found in his family tree.
Some of the school novels share characters with novels by Hadath. 
Some of the novels are situated near where Hadath spent his summers.
The plots of the school novels are common (unjustly accused boys, initial conflict ending in friendship) etc. with many of Hadath's works. Kirkpatrick noted that the Mowbray school stories are similar to those written by Hadath 

Hubin bibliography of crime fiction in 1984 listed five titles as being by Vahey, using the pseudonym John Mowbray. These were
Call the Yard. Skeffington, 1931 
The Frontier Mystery. Collins, 1940 
The Megeve Mystery. Collins, 1941 
On Secret Service. Collins, 1939 
The Radio Mystery. Collins, 1941 
A sixth title, The Way of the Weasel. Partridge, 1922 was listed as being a questionable inclusion.

Of these titles:
Only one of these, Call in the Yard is a crime novel, and this is the only one now attributed to Vahey by Hubin in his updated Crime Fiction IV: A Comprehensive Bibliography 1749-2000. The heroes of this story are not English schoolboys, but young American men. It was clearly not juvenile fiction as it was published in the Spring. A reviewer described as a thriller of a rather naive character in parts. It concerns the efforts of a party wealthy and rather scatter-brained young men to secure some treasure, the supposed whereabouts of which they have to shown a crook. It is pure comedy up to the time the dead body of the crook is discovered, and then complications a deadly character ensue.The attribution of this novel to Vahey is without question as Vahey registered the copyright for this work in the United States (this was the only such registration found for the Mowbray novels).
The next four titles were juvenile fiction, were all published after Vahey's death in 1938, and in most cases had plots centred on the Second World War, which began more than a year after Vahey had died. 
The Way of the Weasel is a public-school story about a boy nicknamed The Weasel.

Works
The following list of major works excludes shorter fiction, the many anthologies and annuals to which Hadath contributed, and only lists the full-length novels. It is drawn from four sources:
The Jisc Library Hub Discover catalogue. This is a collated catalogue of 161 academic and specialist libraries across the UK and Ireland, including The British Library. The J column in the table indicates if the title appears in the Jisc catalogue.
The list of school-boy fiction given in Benjamin Watson's English Schoolboy Stories: An annotated bibliography of hardcover fiction (1992)	The Scarecrow Press, inc., Metuchen, New Jersey. The W column in the table indicates if the title appears in Watson's list. 
The list of boys' school stories presented in The Encyclopedia of Boys School Stories for both Gunby Hadath and John Mowbray.. The E column in the table indicates if the title appears in the Encyclopedia's list. 
The online catalogue of Abe Books for both Gunby Hadath and John Mowbray. The A column in the table indicates if the title appeared in the Abe Books catalogue at 23:00UTC on 23 May 2020.

Notes

References

External links
Books by Gunby on the Jisc Library Hub Discover Catalogue.
Books by Hadath on the Abe Books catalogue. (note that the titles in this catalogue continually change as book are sold, or new titles offered.)
Books by John Mowbray on the Abe Books catalogue. (note that the titles in this catalogue continually change)

1871 births
1954 deaths
British children's writers